Justice Ireland may refer to:

Roderick L. Ireland, chief justice of the Supreme Judicial Court of Massachusetts
Faith Ireland, associate justice of the Washington Supreme Court

See also
Chief Justice of Ireland
Department of Justice (Northern Ireland)
Department of Justice (Ireland)